The International Ammunition Association (IAA) is a nonprofit organization whose stated purpose is to foster interest and knowledge in ammunition of all types and forms.

It was founded in 1955 as the International Cartridge Collectors Association (ICCA), and later changed to its current name. The organization publishes a bi-monthly journal called the IAA Journal.

See also 
 European Cartridge Research Association
 Air travel with firearms and ammunition
 CIP, a European standardization organization for firearm cartridges
 SAAMI, an American standardization organization for firearm cartridges

References

External links

Ammunition
Shooting sports organizations